Costarcha is a monotypic moth genus in the subfamily Arctiinae. Its single species, Costarcha indistincta, is found in India's Nilgiri Mountains. Both the genus and species were first described by George Hampson in 1891.

References

Hampson (1891). III Lepid. Het. 8: 53.

Lithosiini
Monotypic moth genera
Moths of Asia